Radu Scârneci (20 September 1926 − 3 August 2015) was a Romanian alpine skier. He competed at the 1948 Winter Olympics and the 1952 Winter Olympics.

He was the first permanent resident of Poiana Brașov ski resort; the house built in 1933 by his father is the oldest residential house in Poiana Brașov, and is still standing.

References

1926 births
2015 deaths
Romanian male alpine skiers
Olympic alpine skiers of Romania
Alpine skiers at the 1948 Winter Olympics
Alpine skiers at the 1952 Winter Olympics
Sportspeople from Brașov